The Hall Covered Bridge, located in southern Rockingham, Vermont, carries Hall Bridge Road across the Saxtons River, just north of its junction with Vermont Route 121. It is a Town lattice truss bridge, built in 1982 as a replica of a circa-1867 bridge that was destroyed by an overweight truck in 1980. The bridge was listed on the National Register of Historic Places in 1973.

Description and history
It is a single-span lattice truss bridge, based on the patent of architect Ithiel Town, and rests on stone abutments. Its sides are clad in vertical board siding, with three diamond-shaped window openings, and it is topped by a gabled metal roof.

The original bridge was built in 1867 by Sanford Granger, a local master bridge builder. It was, at the time of its listing on the National Register of Historic Places in 1973, one of three surviving 19th-century covered bridges in the town (out of 17 documented to exist). The bridge was destroyed by an overweight truck in 1980, and a replica was built in 1982 by Milton S. Graton, whose penchant for authenticity extended to the use of oxen to move the finished bridge into place.

See also
List of Vermont covered bridges
List of bridges documented by the Historic American Engineering Record in Vermont
List of bridges on the National Register of Historic Places in Vermont
National Register of Historic Places listings in Windham County, Vermont

References

External links

Covered bridges on the National Register of Historic Places in Vermont
Bridges completed in 1867
Covered bridges in Windham County, Vermont
Historic American Engineering Record in Vermont
National Register of Historic Places in Windham County, Vermont
Bridges completed in 1982
Buildings and structures demolished in 1980
Road bridges on the National Register of Historic Places in Vermont
Wooden bridges in Vermont
Lattice truss bridges in the United States
Buildings and structures in Rockingham, Vermont
1867 establishments in Vermont
1982 establishments in Vermont
1980 disestablishments in Vermont